Ramma Chilakamma is a 2001 Indian Telugu-language romantic drama film directed by Tammareddy Bharadwaja and starring Sumanth and Laya. The title of the film is based on a song from Choodalani Vundi (1998). Ramma Chilakamma is a remake of the Tamil film Ennamma Kannu (2000). After being delayed, the film released on 13 July 2001 and was a box-office failure.

Plot

Cast 
Sumanth as Kaasi
Laya as Gayatri
Akash as Vishwa
Brahmanandam in a dual role
Tanikella Bharani
Kovai Sarala

Production 
A different film under the same name was planned with Venkat. Tammareddy Bharadwaja reused the title for this film. The title is based on a song from Choodalani Vundi (1998). The film is a remake of the Tamil film Ennamma Kannu (2000). Akash played a small role in the film.

Soundtrack 
Music was composed by R. P. Patnaik.

Release and reception 
After being delayed, the film released on 13 July 2001.

Ajay Bashyam of Full Hyderabad wrote that "Raamma Chilakamma gets better after the first 45 minutes when the main story kicks in, and keeps you actually interested in knowing what's going to happen next".

The film was a box office failure.

References

External links 
 

2000s Telugu-language films
2001 films
Indian romantic drama films
Telugu remakes of Tamil films
2001 romantic drama films